Manticore, in comics, may refer to:

 Manticore (City of Heroes), a character from the comic based on the video game City of Heroes
 Manticore, a character who is part of the Onslaught (DC Comics) team in the DC Comics universe

See also
Manticore (disambiguation)